Major-General James Fitzgerald Martin  (12 June 1876 – 14 February 1958) was a distinguished officer of the British Army who served as Surgeon to George VI, and to the Viceroy of India, Lord Mountbatten.

Birth and family

Martin was the son of Colonel W. T. Martin.

James Fitzgerald Martin married, at Exeter Cathedral in 1906, Mary Latimer Hawks Moody (1883 – 1960), who was the eldest son of Colonel Richard S. Hawks Moody and the granddaughter of Major-General Richard Clement Moody, who was the founder of British Columbia. Martin and his wife had one daughter, Mary Charlotte (b. 1909).

Military career
Martin was commissioned into the British Army as a lieutenant on 4 December 1899. He served in the Second Boer War in South Africa from 1900 – 1902, for which he received both the Queen's South Africa Medal, with four clasps, and the King's South Africa Medal, with two clasps. After the end of this war, he was promoted to captain on 4 December 1902, then to major in 1911. He served in World War I between 1914 and 1918, during which he was promoted to lieutenant-colonel in 1917. For his service in this war, he was mentioned in despatches five times and received the CMG, the CBE, and the 1914 Star. Martin was promoted to colonel in 1927; and to Major-General in 1931. He retired in 1935.

Medical Career
Martin was employed between 1940 - 1943 by the Ministry of Health as Inspector of Hospitals and Assistant Hospital Officer of No. 3 and No. 6 Regions. He was employed by the Southern Region department of the Ministry of Pensions from 1944 to 1947. Martin served as Honorary Surgeon to King George VI, and to the Viceroy of India, Lord Mountbatten. He was invested as a Knight of the Order of Saint John of Jerusalem. He was also invested as a Knight of the Order of the Crown of Belgium.

References

1876 births
1958 deaths
British Army generals
Companions of the Order of the Bath
Companions of the Order of St Michael and St George
Commanders of the Order of the British Empire
Knights of the Order of St John
Knights of the Order of the Crown (Belgium)
British Army personnel of the Second Boer War
People educated at Bath College (English public school)
Alumni of the University of Edinburgh Medical School
British Army personnel of World War I
English civil servants
Civil servants in the Ministry of Health (United Kingdom)
Civil servants in the Ministry of Pensions
Royal Army Medical Corps officers